Parnassius autocrator is a species of butterfly in the family Papilionidae. It is found in Afghanistan and Tajikistan. Parnassius autocrator is a high-altitude butterfly (up to 3,000 m). The preferred larval food plant is Corydalis adiantifolia.

References

Further reading
Krejtsberg A. V., 1987 Ecologie de Parnassius autocrator (Lepidoptera): une espèce rare de papilionidés On the ecology of Parnassius autocrator (Lepidoptera): a rare species of papilionids Zoologičeskij žurnal (in Russian) ISSN 0044-5134 Nauka, Moskva Russian Federation

sv:Parnassius autocrator Swedish Wikipedia provides further references and synonymy

External links 

Goran Waldeck Photos
Rusinsects Text and photos

autocrator
Butterflies described in 1913
Taxonomy articles created by Polbot